Tatyana Pavlovna Ehrenfest, later van Aardenne-Ehrenfest, (Vienna, October 28, 1905 – Dordrecht, November 29, 1984) was a Dutch mathematician. She was the daughter of Paul Ehrenfest (1880–1933) and Tatyana Alexeyevna Afanasyeva (1876–1964).

Under her married name, Tanja van Aardenne-Ehrenfest, she is known for her contributions to De Bruijn sequences, low-discrepancy sequences, and the BEST theorem.

Education
Tatyana Ehrenfest was born in Vienna and spent her childhood in St Petersburg. In 1912 the Ehrenfests moved to Leiden where her father succeeded H.A. Lorentz as professor at the University of Leiden. Until 1917 she was home schooled; after that, she attended the Gymnasium in Leiden and passed the final exams in 1922.
She studied mathematics and physics at the University of Leiden. In 1928 she went to Göttingen where she took courses from Harald Bohr and Max Born. On December 8, 1931, she obtained her Ph.D. in Leiden. After that, she was never employed and, in particular, never held any academic position.

Contributions
De Bruijn sequences are cyclic sequences of symbols for a given alphabet and parameter  such that every length- subsequence occurs exactly once within them. They are named after Nicolaas Govert de Bruijn, despite their earlier discovery (for binary alphabets) by Camille Flye Sainte-Marie. De Bruijn and Ehrenfest jointly published the first investigation into de Bruijn sequences for larger alphabets, in 1951.

The BEST theorem, also known as the de Bruijn–van Aardenne-Ehrenfest–Smith–Tutte theorem, relates Euler tours and spanning trees in directed graphs, and gives a product formula for their number. It is a variant of an earlier formula of Smith and Tutte, and was published by de Bruijn and Ehrenfest in the same paper as their work on de Bruijn sequences.

Ehrenfest is also known for her proof of a lower bound on low-discrepancy sequences.

References 
  Oppervlakken met scharen van gesloten geodetische lijnen, Thesis, Leiden, 1931.
  N.G. de Bruijn, In memoriam T. van Aardenne-Ehrenfest, 1905–1984, Nieuw Archief voor Wiskunde (4), Vol.3, (1985) 235–236.
  
  
  Eric W. Weisstein. Discrepancy Theorem. From MathWorld – A Wolfram Web Resource.

1905 births
1984 deaths
20th-century Dutch mathematicians
Dutch Jews
Combinatorialists
People from Leiden
Austrian emigrants to the Netherlands
Austrian Jews
Austrian people of Ukrainian descent
Austrian people of Russian descent
20th-century women mathematicians
Austro-Hungarian expatriates in the Russian Empire